Joe Biden, current President of the United States (2021–present), Vice President of the United States (2009–2017), and United States Senator from Delaware (1973–2009), has sought the office of President of the United States three times:
 Joe Biden 1988 presidential campaign, an unsuccessful campaign.
 Joe Biden 2008 presidential campaign, an unsuccessful campaign but resulted in Biden being elected the 47th vice president of the United States.
 Joe Biden 2020 presidential campaign, a successful campaign resulting in Biden being elected the 46th president of the United States and receiving the most popular votes in American history.